WTK may refer to:
 Noatak Airport, Alaska, IATA airport code WTK
 Watakataui language, ISO 639-3 language code wtk
 We the Kings, an American rock band
 The Well-Tempered Clavier (Das wohltemperierte Klavier, WTK), a book of musical works by Bach

See also
 WTKS (disambiguation)
 List of widget toolkits